The Stonehenge of Manipur is an ancient pre-historic megalithic monument in the northern mountains of Willong Khullen, a village in Manipur, India. It has been likened to England's megalith at Stonehenge. Legend says the gigantic stone structures located at the site were originally erected by the forefathers of the present day Maram people.

References

Archaeological sites in Manipur
Megalithic monuments in India